Łubki may refer to the following:
Łubki, Kuyavian-Pomeranian Voivodeship (north-central Poland)
Łubki, Lublin Voivodeship (east Poland)
Łubki, Silesian Voivodeship (south Poland)
 Lubki, the plural of lubok, a form of Russian popular printing